Idrettslaget Bjarg is a sports club in Stavollen, Bergen not far from Bergen Flesland Airport. It supports football, handball, athletics, and gymnastics. The football team plays in the 3. divisjon, the fourth tier in the Norwegian football league system.

Football team, recent history

Men's team 
{|class="wikitable"
|-bgcolor="#efefef"
! Season
!
! Pos.
! Pl.
! W
! D
! L
! GS
! GA
! P
!Cup
!Notes
|-
|2004
|5. divisjon, Hordaland section 1
|align=right bgcolor="#DDFFDD"| 2
|align=right|22||align=right|15||align=right|2||align=right|5
|align=right|80||align=right|46||align=right|47
|
|Promoted
|-
|2005
|4. divisjon, Hordaland section 1
|align=right|8
|align=right|22||align=right|7||align=right|4||align=right|11
|align=right|44||align=right|47||align=right|25
|
|
|-
|2006
|4. divisjon, Hordaland section 2
|align=right|5
|align=right|22||align=right|10||align=right|4||align=right|8
|align=right|55||align=right|49||align=right|34
|
|
|-
|2007
|4. divisjon, Hordaland section 1
|align=right|3
|align=right|24||align=right|12||align=right|5||align=right|7
|align=right|56||align=right|36||align=right|41
|
|
|-
|2008
|4. divisjon, Hordaland section 2
|align=right bgcolor="#DDFFDD"| 2
|align=right|22||align=right|15||align=right|4||align=right|3
|align=right|51||align=right|32||align=right|49
|
|Promoted
|-
|2009
|3. divisjon, Hordaland section 2
|align=right|7
|align=right|22||align=right|7||align=right|7||align=right|8
|align=right|33||align=right|38||align=right|28
|
|
|-
|2010
|3. divisjon, Hordaland section 1
|align=right|5
|align=right|22||align=right|10||align=right|3||align=right|9
|align=right|37||align=right|32||align=right|33
|1st qual. round
|
|-
|2011
|3. divisjon, section 8
|align=right|2
|align=right|26||align=right|14||align=right|3||align=right|9
|align=right|59||align=right|40||align=right|45
|2nd round
|
|-
|2012
|3. divisjon, section 7
|align=right|8
|align=right|26||align=right|11||align=right|4||align=right|11
|align=right|44||align=right|47||align=right|37
|1st round
|
|-
|2013
|3. divisjon, section 8
|align=right|3
|align=right|24||align=right|13||align=right|0||align=right|11
|align=right|53||align=right|43||align=right|39
|2nd qual. round
|
|-
|2014
|3. divisjon, section 7
|align=right|4
|align=right|26||align=right|11||align=right|9||align=right|6
|align=right|58||align=right|45||align=right|42
|1st round
|
|-
|2015
|3. divisjon, section 7
|align=right|9
|align=right|26||align=right|8||align=right|4||align=right|14
|align=right|47||align=right|58||align=right|28
|1st qual. round
|
|-
|2016
|3. divisjon, section 7
|align=right bgcolor="#FFCCCC"| 5
|align=right|24||align=right|12||align=right|4||align=right|8
|align=right|56||align=right|50||align=right|40
|2nd qual. round
|Relegated
|-
|2017
|4. divisjon, Hordaland section 1
|align=right|4
|align=right|22||align=right|9||align=right|6||align=right|7
|align=right|47||align=right|41||align=right|33
|1st round
|
|-
|2018
|4. divisjon, Hordaland section 2
|align=right|7
|align=right|22||align=right|9||align=right|3||align=right|10
|align=right|46||align=right|37||align=right|30
|1st qual. round
|
|-
|2019
|4. divisjon, Hordaland section 1
|align=right bgcolor="#DDFFDD"| 1
|align=right|22||align=right|14||align=right|6||align=right|2
|align=right|60||align=right|37||align=right|48
|1st qual. round
|Promoted
|-
|2020
|colspan="11"|Season cancelled
|-
|2021
|3. divisjon, section 4
|align=right|5
|align=right|13||align=right|7||align=right|1||align=right|5
|align=right|25||align=right|29||align=right|22
|1st round
|
|-
|2022
|3. divisjon, section 3
|align=right|6
|align=right|26||align=right|12||align=right|5||align=right|9
|align=right|47||align=right|44||align=right|41
|2nd round
|
|}
Source:

References

External links 
 Official site

Football clubs in Norway
Sport in Bergen
Association football clubs established in 1947
1947 establishments in Norway